The 2014 FC Spartak Semey season was the club's 1st season back in the Kazakhstan Premier League, the highest tier of association football in Kazakhstan, since 2004 and their 14th season in total. Spartak Semey finished the season in 12th position and were relegated back to the Kazakhstan First Division whilst also being knocked out of the Kazakhstan Cup at the First Round by FC Lashyn.

Squad

Transfers

Winter

In:

 

Out:

Summer

In:

Out:

Competitions

Kazakhstan Premier League

First round

Results summary

Results

League table

Relegation round

Results summary

Results

Table

Kazakhstan Cup

Squad statistics

Goal scorers

References

External links
 Official Site

Spartak Semey
FC Spartak Semey seasons